Werner Roth (25 July 1925 – 25 March 2011) was a German football player and manager.

Roth played as a midfielder for VfB Mühlburg between 1948 and 1952. He remained with the club following Muhlburg's merger with Karlsruher FC Phönix and played for newly formed Karlsruher SC until 1959, appearing 156 times and scoring 10 goals in the Oberliga Süd. He also coached the club in the Bundesliga from 19 October 1965 until 1 November 1966.

References

External links
 

1925 births
2011 deaths
German footballers
Association football midfielders
Karlsruher SC players
German football managers
Bundesliga managers
Karlsruher SC managers
Place of birth missing
West German footballers
West German football managers